Orocrambus jansoni is a species of moth in the family Crambidae. It is endemic to New Zealand. This species is classified as "At Risk, Naturally Uncommon" by the Department of Conservation.

Taxonomy 
This species was described by David Edward Gaskin in 1975 using a specimen he collected at Waiouru. The holotype specimen is held at the New Zealand Arthropod Collection.

Description 
Gaskin described the species as follows:

Distribution 
This species is endemic to New Zealand. It has been recorded from the central part of the North Island, east of Mount Ruapehu.

Biology and behaviour 
O. jansoni are active during the day. Adults have been recorded on the wing from December to February. The female of the species is a more reluctant flier than the male. The species has been trapped with ultra-violet light as well as mercury vapour lamp traps. It has also been collected by netting or sweeping likely grasses.

Host species and habitat 
The host species of this moth is unconfirmed but it has been hypothesised that it is likely Rytidosperma pulchrum as females of the species have been discovered at the base of this plant. O. jansoni is known to inhabit roadside grasslands along the Desert Road north of Waiouru, and has also been collected at the Rangitaiki Frost Flats. It is likely that it also inhabits New Zealand Defence Force land around Waiouru. It prefers open grassland habitat.

Conservation Status 
This species has been classified as having the "At Risk, Naturally Uncommon" conservation status under the New Zealand Threat Classification System.

References

Crambinae
Moths described in 1975
Moths of New Zealand
Endemic fauna of New Zealand
Endangered biota of New Zealand
Endemic moths of New Zealand